Dmitry Barkov may refer to:
Dmitry Barkov (footballer) (born 1992), Russian footballer
Dmitri Barkov (sport shooter) (1880–?), Russian sport shooter